The Rolls-Royce AE 3007 (US military: F137) is a turbofan engine produced by Rolls-Royce North America, sharing a common core with the Rolls-Royce T406 (AE 1107) and AE 2100. The engine was originally developed by the Allison Engine Company, hence the "AE" in the model number.

Development

In 1988, Allison Engine Company (then owned by General Motors) and Rolls-Royce plc began joint studies of a  RB580 to power the proposed Short Brothers FJX regional jet, combining the T406 core with a Rolls-Royce low-pressure spool.
By late 1989, amid growing importance of the Rolls-Royce Trent engine and uncertainty over the Short Brothers project, Rolls-Royce quit. Allison Engine Company pursued the engine alone, revising the design as a new wide-chord snubberless (or clapperless) titanium fan and low-pressure turbine.

On March 23, 1990, Allison's GMA 3007 was selected to power the Embraer EMB-145 regional jet. In September 1990, it was selected for the Cessna Citation X.
The engine was first ground tested in mid-1991. On August 21, 1992, the engine had its first test flight on a Cessna Citation VII testbed aircraft.
In 1995, Rolls-Royce bought Allison Engine Company and the engine had its first flight on the EMB-145.
The Citation X AE3007C, producing , was certificated by the FAA in February 1995; while the 
EMB-145 AE3007A, producing , was certificated in mid-1996.

It was tested at these altitudes in February 1996 at the Arnold Engineering Development Center in Tennessee and the first was delivered in May 1996.

More than 3,400 engines have been delivered.
In 2014, 2,976 civil engines were installed.
In 2017, the AE 3007 in the ERJ family had flown over 53 million hours and over 44 million cycles.
It was flown for more than 60 million hours.
The engine is manufactured at the Rolls-Royce North America engine plant in Indianapolis, Indiana.

Design

The AE 3007 is a direct drive turbofan engine with a single stage fan, a 14-stage axial compressor with 6 stages of variable vanes including inlet guide vanes, an annular combustor, a two-stage high pressure turbine and a 3-stage low pressure turbine.
The accessory gearbox is mounted at its bottom and two single channel FADEC units are mounted in the aircraft.
It has fore and aft mounting provisions for underwing pylon or aft fuselage installation.

Variants
AE 3007C, C1, C2
 Cessna Citation X
AE 3007A, A1, A1/1, A1/3, A3, A1P, A1E, A2
 Embraer ERJ family
 Embraer Legacy 600
 Embraer R-99
AE 3007G
Proposed powerplant for the 48-50 seat Fairchild Dornier 528JET
AE 3007H (F137)
 Northrop Grumman RQ-4 Global Hawk
 Northrop Grumman MQ-4C Triton
AE 3007N
 Boeing MQ-25 Stingray
GMA 3008
A proposed  thrust variant with a  diameter fan
AE3009
A proposed  thrust version with a new high-pressure turbine ceramic-matrix composite tailcone
GMA 3010 / AE 3010
A  thrust variant, which was to power the Yakovlev Yak-77 twin-engine business jet as a derated variant of the GMA 3012 with a  fan
GMA 3012 / AE 3012
A proposed  thrust variant with a  fan, two-stage intermediate compressor, an extra stage in the low pressure turbine, and an advanced high pressure turbine
GMA 3014 / GMA 3014 ADV
A proposed variant targeted toward the Regioplane consortium's 80-130-seat Regioliner RL 92/RL 122 (the successor to the MPC 75), with a  fan,  of thrust, a new eight-stage compressor, dual-bank combustor, and a four-stage low pressure turbine

Applications
 Boeing MQ-25 Stingray
 Cessna Citation X
 Embraer ERJ family
 Embraer Legacy 600
 Embraer R-99
 Northrop Grumman RQ-4 Global Hawk
 Northrop Grumman MQ-4C Triton

Specifications

See also

References

External links

 
 
 
 

High-bypass turbofan engines
1990s turbofan engines
AE 3007